The Tallapoosa-class cutters is a group of two Coast Guard cutters that served with the United States Coast Guard from the 1920s to the late 1940s.

Design 

The Tallapoosa-class cutters were designed for long cruises, and their hulls were reinforced for light ice-breaking.

During World War II, the Ossipee was actually classified as a river gunboat (WPR) while the Tallapoosa was classified as a patrol gunboat (WPG).

Ships in class 
 Ossipee
 Tallapoosa

References

 Ossipee (1915), US Coast Guard website
 Canney, Donald L. (1995): U.S. Coast Guard and Revenue Cutters, 1790-1935 (Annapolis, MD: Naval Institute Press).
 Scheina, Robert L. (1982): U.S. Coast Guard Cutters and Craft in World War II (Annapolis, MD: Naval Institute Press).
 U.S. Coast Guard. Public Information Division. Historical Section (1949): The Coast Guard at War: Transports and Escorts (Vol. V) (Washington, DC: Public Information Division, U.S. Coast Guard Headquarters.

External links

 
Gunboat classes